Marcus Loader (born 5 November 1943) is a British former sports shooter. He competed in the 50 metre pistol event at the 1968 Summer Olympics.

References

1943 births
Living people
British male sport shooters
Olympic shooters of Great Britain
Shooters at the 1968 Summer Olympics
Sportspeople from Rugby, Warwickshire